Heart Blackened is a 2017 South Korean crime drama film starring Choi Min-shik, Park Shin-hye, Ryu Jun-yeol, Lee Hanee, Park Hae-joon, Jo Han-chul, and Lee Soo-kyung. It is a remake of the Chinese film Silent Witness.

Synopsis 
Im Tae-san (Choi Min-sik), a man with wealth, love and the world, believes that everything is perfectly happy. His fiancée and famous singer Yoo-na (Lee Hanee) is murdered, and his daughter Im Mi-ra (Lee Soo-kyung) is pointed out as a suspect. Lim Tae-san starts pursuing the case in his own way to make her daughter innocent, who cannot remember what happened that day. He appoints a young lawyer, Choi Hee-jeong (Park Shin-hye), who believes in Mira's innocence and cares for her, refusing the best lawyers. A fierce court battle surrounding the 7-hour truth — that Mira doesn't remember, but the existence of Yoo-na's fan Kim Dong-myeong (Ryu Jun-yeol), who has CCTV footage of the day that disappeared — is revealed and the case goes in an unexpected direction.

Cast 
Choi Min-sik as Im Tae-san
Park Shin-hye as Choi Hee-jeong
Ryu Jun-yeol as Kim Dong-myeong
Lee Hanee as Park Yoo-na
Park Hae-joon as Dong Seong-sik
Jo Han-chul as Jeong Seung-gil
Lee Soo-kyung as Im Mi-ra
Park Gyu-young as Female college student
Oh Ah-yeon as Overseas Korean
Kim Soo-jin as Presiding judge
Park Ho-san as Chief Prosecutor

Production
Filming wrapped after 4 months of shooting on February 7, 2017, in Bangkok, Thailand.

Awards and nominations

References

2017 films
2010s Korean-language films
2017 crime drama films
South Korean crime drama films
South Korean remakes of foreign films
Films directed by Jung Ji-woo
CJ Entertainment films
2010s South Korean films